La Lega Nazionale is an Italian co-operative association founded in 1891 on irredentist ideals. It grew out of The Federation of Italian Co-operatives, formed in 1886 with 248 co-ops representing 74,000 members. Following the 1992 Italian cooperative legal reform, which was lobbied for by La Lega, La Lega introduced capital participation in ownership by minority soci sovventori, capital memberships, with restricted voting rights.

La Lega is Italy's largest umbrella group for collectives, promoting the interests of the cooperative sector at all levels of government. La Lega (or Legacoop) covers more than 17,000 cooperatives, including 5,000 worker co-ops, 3,000 agricultural co-ops, 2,000 consumer co-ops and 5,000 housing co-ops. By 2002, La Lega's total membership exceeded 6 million people, or slightly more than 10 percent of the Italian population. Of these members, 4.6 million belonged to La Lega's consumer co-ops.

External links 
Official Website

References

Cooperatives in Italy